MHAC can mean: 

 the Mental Health Act Commission, a former NHS special health authority 
 Microhydranencephaly, a severe abnormality of brain development
 the Mental Health & Addiction Advocacy Coalition, a non-profit organization in Ohio.